Arukaino Umukoro is a Nigerian Journalist notable for winning the CNN/MultiChoice Africa Journalist Award in the year 2015.

Education 
Umukoro studied Industrial Chemistry at the Delta State University and thereafter proceeded to the Nigerian Institute of Journalism for graduate studies in Journalism. In 2016, Umukoro concluded a Master's programme in Media and Communication at the Pan-African University.

Career 
Umukoro's career in Journalism commenced when he was recruited as a reporter by the National Standard news magazine in 2007. He earned the National Standard’s ‘Writer of the Year’ award in 2007. He thereafter made a career move when he joined the stables of Tell Magazine. He subsequently joined The Punch where he rose to be a senior correspondent. Umukoro won the Nigeria Media Merit Award for the first time in 2013 and again in 2017. In 2015, Arukaino was named as the CNN/MultiChoice Africa Journalist in the Sports Category. He also won the S.O. Idowu Prize for Sports reporting in which he was the second runner-up, in 2017. In 2017, he was appointed into the Nigerian Government as an Aide on Communication Projects to the Nigerian Vice President, Yemi Osinbajo.

References 

Living people
Nigerian journalists
Year of birth missing (living people)